Reidar Durie Holter (28 December 1892 – 19 June 1953) was a Norwegian rower who competed in the 1912 Summer Olympics.

Holter was born in Oslo. He was a crew member of the Norwegian boat that won the bronze medal in the coxed four, inriggers.

Holter died in Los Angeles in 1953 at the age of 60.

References

1892 births
1953 deaths
Norwegian male rowers
Olympic rowers of Norway
Rowers at the 1912 Summer Olympics
Olympic bronze medalists for Norway
Olympic medalists in rowing
Medalists at the 1912 Summer Olympics